Stacked is an American television sitcom that aired on Fox from April 13, 2005 to January 11, 2006.

Premise
Stacked was described as the opposite of Cheers, instead of a smart person in a "dumb" place, it is based on the concept of a dumb person in a "smart" place. A workplace ensemble comedy, Stacked revolves around Skyler Dayton (Pamela Anderson) who is tired of her non-stop partying lifestyle and bad choices in boyfriends. Wanting a major life change, she wanders into Stacked Books, a small, family-run bookstore owned by Gavin Miller (Elon Gold) and his brother, Stuart (Brian Scolaro).

Divorced and unlucky in love himself, Gavin's inclined to regard Skyler as an embodiment of the vacuous, image-obsessed culture he has come to abhor. Stuart, however, is dazzled by Skyler's beauty and, much to Gavin's horror, offers her a job at their store, which she happily accepts as the first step in her quest for a steadier lifestyle. Unhappy that she is going to be minding the till next to such an intimidating bombshell is the store's sole other employee, Katrina (Marissa Jaret Winokur), who doles out doses of realism and cynicism. Rounding out the characters is the store's one steady customer, Harold March (Christopher Lloyd), a preeminent, but retired, rocket scientist.

The series has been sold to other television channels around the world including Paramount Comedy 1 in the United Kingdom, Channel 7 in Australia, vtm in Belgium, True Series in Thailand, Italia 1 in Italy, TV3 in Norway, CNBC-e in Turkey, Star World in Asia, Comedy Central in Germany, Comedy Central in Poland and F/X Brasil and Global Television Network in Canada.

Cast and characters
 Pamela Anderson - Skyler Dayton, tired of her non-stop partying lifestyle, enters "Stacked," a small family-run bookstore, and takes a job.
 Elon Gold - Gavin P. Miller is divorced and unlucky in love. He sees Skyler as representative of the vacuous, image-obsessed culture he has come to abhor.
 Brian Scolaro - Stuart Miller is Gavin's younger brother, and holds a master's degree in psychology. He is smitten with Skyler and offers her a job at the store.
 Marissa Jaret Winokur - Katrina works at the store's coffee counter. She feels threatened by Skyler's presence.  She is also chronically unlucky, having grown two sets of wisdom teeth, found herself knocked out while behind stage at an Aerosmith concert, and is always late for work.
 Christopher Lloyd - Professor Harold March is a regular customer to whom Katrina always reveals her nefarious plans. Skyler loves to play with his hair.  He is always reading the newspaper.  His presence commands gravitas, however whenever he speaks, he sounds like a crazy man.

The bookstore
All of the books seen in the show are provided by HarperCollins, which, like Fox, is owned by NewsCorp. Books that are prominently displayed are based on The New York Times Best Seller list. Some titles seen include State of Fear, Don Quixote, The Known World, and Anansi Boys.

The entire bookstore is one main set, though there are three central areas: the coffee shop, the cash register, and the back office, which has a door.  There are stairs on the set next to the coffee shop, but it is unknown where they lead.  There is also an elevator near the magazine racks, behind the coffee shop.

Episodes

Season 1: 2005

Season 2: 2005–2006

Ratings
Seasonal rankings (based on average total viewers per episode) of Stacked on the Fox Network.

Home media
On December 12, 2006, Fox Home Entertainment released Stacked: The Complete Series on DVD. The set contains all 19 episodes, including the five not originally aired. The episodes as presented on the DVD set feature a truncated version of the opening theme. Bonus features include: Nipplegate: Getting Dressed With Pam, Show Us Your Bloopers, and Skyler Dayton's Guide To Dating.

References

External links
 

2000s American sitcoms
2000s American workplace comedy television series
2005 American television series debuts
2006 American television series endings
Bookstores in fiction
English-language television shows
Fox Broadcasting Company original programming
Television series by Steven Levitan Productions
Television series by 20th Century Fox Television
Television series set in shops